The Hellenism Party was a Greek political party with a strongly nationalist platform, founded in 1981. Sotiris Sofianopoulos was the President of the Hellenism Party since its foundation. During the elections, the party never gathered more than 0.3%. In 2004, the party collaborated with the Popular Orthodox Rally, in the Greek elections of that year.

Electoral results

External links
 Official site inactive since 2006

Political parties established in 1981
Defunct nationalist parties in Greece
Political parties disestablished in 2004